New South Wales Heritage Database, or State Heritage Inventory, is an online database of information about historic sites  in New South Wales, Australia with statutory heritage listings.

Contents 
It holds the information about sites listed on the New South Wales State Heritage Register (over 1,650 entries) in addition to sites on heritage lists managed by New South Wales local government authorities and other statutory heritage registers.

It is important to note that this is an online database holding information about historic sites but is not in itself a heritage register. An historic site can have multiple entries in this database if it is listed multiple heritage registers. For example, Young railway station is on three heritage registers and therefore has three entries in the database.

Licensing 
The database is licensed CC-BY except for material identified as being the copyright of third parties.

References

External links 

 Search the New South Wales Heritage Database (State Heritage Inventory)

 
Databases in Australia
Online databases